

List

References

B